Al Qabas (Arabic: القبس; The Flash) is the title of two Arabic newspapers both of which were published in Damascus, Syria. The first one was in circulation between 1913 and 1916. The second one was published in the period 1920–1958 with some interruptions.

Al Qabas (1913–1916)
The paper was launched by Shukri Al Asali in September 1913. Al Asali edited the paper until 1916 when he was executed.

Al Qabas (1920–1958)
Muhammad Kurd Ali, a Syrian historian, established a paper entitled Al Muqtabas in Damascus in 1920. From 1928 the paper was renamed Al Qabas which was edited by Najib Al Rayyis, a Syrian journalist. It was published by Dimashq in Damascus. One of the frequent contributors was Munir Al Ajlani, a Syrian jurist. Al Qabas was one of the publications supporting Arab nationalism and subject to frequent bans due to its radical and uncompromising political stance. The paper opposed to the idea of Greater Syria. During this period Al Qabas was close to the National Party. Najib Al Rayyis published anti-Semitic editorials in the paper. In 1952 when Najib Al Rayyis died the paper folded, but soon it was restarted. However, this second period was not so long, and the last issue of the paper appeared on 19 January 1958.

References

1913 establishments in Ottoman Syria
1920 establishments in the Ottoman Empire
1916 disestablishments in the Ottoman Empire
1958 disestablishments in Syria
Antisemitic publications
Arabic-language newspapers
Daily newspapers published in Syria
Defunct newspapers published in Syria
Mass media in Damascus
Newspapers established in 1913
Newspapers established in 1920
Publications disestablished in 1916
Publications disestablished in 1958
Arab nationalism in Syria
Pan-Arabist media